The 1979 Liverpool Edge Hill by-election was a parliamentary by-election held in England on 29 March 1979 to elect a new Member of Parliament (MP) for the House of Commons constituency of Liverpool Edge Hill.

Polling in the by-election took place one day after the government of James Callaghan had lost a vote of no confidence in parliament and slightly over a month before the 1979 general election. The seat had become vacant on the death the previous December of the constituency's  Labour Party MP Sir Arthur Irvine, who had held the seat since a by-election in 1947.

The result was a gain for the Liberal Party, represented by David Alton. Having made his maiden speech on 3 April, just before the house rose for the election, he was re-elected a few weeks later and from 1983 held the Mossley Hill seat until he stood down from the commons in 1997, 18 years after the by-election.

Votes

See also
 Liverpool Edge Hill (UK Parliament constituency)
 1947 Liverpool Edge Hill by-election
 List of United Kingdom by-elections
 List of parliamentary constituencies in Merseyside

References

External links
 David Alton's account of the by-election

1979 elections in the United Kingdom
1979 in England
1970s in Liverpool
Edge Hill, 1979